The  is a railway line operated by East Japan Railway Company (JR East). It connects Noheji Station and Ōminato Station on the Shimokita Peninsula in eastern Aomori Prefecture.

Station list 

●: All rapid service trains stop, ○: Some rapid service trains stop

History
On March 20, 1921 the  began operations between Noheji Station and Mutsu-Yokohama Station. The line was extended to its present terminus of Ōminato Station by September 25, 1921. In 1922 the line was nationalised, and renamed the Ōminato Line of the Japanese Government Railway (JGR, later JNR).

Express Natsudomari operations began from Aomori Station on a seasonal basis in 1968. The express was later downgraded to rapid service and renamed the Usori, and later the Shimokita. All freight operations ceased on February 1, 1984. With the dissolution and privatization of the JNR on April 1, 1984 the line came under the control of the East Japan Railway Company. On December 4, 1999 a new centralized traffic control (CTC) system became operational. In 2002, seasonal excursion train Kirakira Michinoku operations commenced and a limited number of Shimokita trains were extended to terminate at Hachinohe Station instead of Noheji. The Shimokita service operates a daily round trip to Aomori and 3 round trips to Hachinohe in conjunction with the Aoimori Railway.

The Tōhoku Main Line, including Noheji was transferred from JR East to Aoimori Railway on December 4, 2010 following the extension of the Tohoku Shinkansen from Hachinohe to Shin-Aomori. This resulted in the isolation of the Ōminato Line, a branch of the Tōhoku Main Line,  from the rest of the JR East network with the exception of the Shimokita service from Aomori where it connects with the Ōu Main Line and Tsugaru Line.

Former connecting lines
 Akagawa station - The Aomori Prefectural Government operated a 4 km 762mm (2'6") gauge line to Tanabu-Yanagicho between 1921 and 1941.
 Shimokita station - The 18 km  opened in 1939, and construction continued toward Ōma to service a proposed naval base to protect the Tsugaru Strait, and was well advanced when work was suspended in 1943 due to a shortage of materials. The Seikan Tunnel was originally proposed to utilise the roadbed of the uncompleted  (as well as that of the uncompleted  near Hakodate) but in 1968 the route was changed to the alignment subsequently built. The line closed in 2001.

References
This article incorporates material from the corresponding article in the Japanese Wikipedia.
 JTB Timetable December 2010 issue

External links
JR East website

 
Rail transport in Aomori Prefecture
Lines of East Japan Railway Company
Railway lines opened in 1921
1067 mm gauge railways in Japan